The 1880 Colorado gubernatorial election was held on November 2, 1880. Incumbent Republican Frederick Walker Pitkin defeated Democratic nominee John S. Hough with 53.28% of the vote.

General election

Candidates
Major party candidates
Frederick Walker Pitkin, Republican
John S. Hough, Democratic

Other candidates
A. J. Chittenden, Greenback

Results

References

1880
Colorado
Gubernatorial